The Cleveland Jr. Barons were a junior ice hockey team that played in the North American Hockey League and played out of Parma, Ohio.  They were a branch of the Cleveland Barons Hockey Association. Their top accomplishment was winning the 2006 North Division playoff title, allowing them to advance to Robertson Cup tournament.  However, after the 2005–2006 season, the team moved to Columbus, Ohio and transferred to the United States Hockey League, playing as the Ohio Junior Blue Jackets.

NHL alumni
John Albert: Winnipeg Jets
Carter Camper: Boston Bruins
Sean Collins: Washington Capitals
Dan Fritsche: Columbus Blue Jackets
Peter Harrold: Los Angeles Kings
Michael Rupp: New Jersey Devils, Phoenix Coyotes, Columbus Blue Jackets, Pittsburgh Penguins, New York Rangers, and Minnesota Wild (Scored game winning goal of 2003 Stanley Cup Finals)
Ben Simon: Atlanta Thrashers and Columbus Blue Jackets
Jim Slater: Atlanta Thrashers and Winnipeg Jets
Bill Thomas, Phoenix Coyotes, Pittsburgh Penguins, and Florida Panthers

Youth organization
The Cleveland Barons Hockey Association still sponsors a number of youth hockey teams named the Cleveland Barons, including U16 and U18 teams.

References
www.clebarons.com

Ice hockey teams in Cleveland
Parma, Ohio
Defunct North American Hockey League teams